The suicide of Bill Conradt was the November 2006 death of a local assistant district attorney in the Dallas–Fort Worth metroplex while Texas police served him with search and arrest warrants stemming from a Dateline NBCPerverted-Justice online sting of men soliciting sex with children.

Perverted-Justice (PJ) and Dateline conducted their sting, luring men to a bait house in Murphy, Texas.  Conradt was one of the men who solicited the PJ volunteer masquerading as a minor, but did not travel to Murphy.  Instead, a group of police, Dateline, and PJ personnel executed questionable arrest and search warrants at Conradt's home in Terrell, Texas.  After SWAT breached the house, Conradt shot himself.

The suicide was another point of contention over To Catch a Predator three-party relationship between law-enforcement, civilian volunteers, and the news media.  Police were criticized for improper execution of their duties in the service of ratings, and NBC was criticized for leading police operations at the expense of safety and justice.  Ultimately, there continue to be unresolved conflicting claims from both the people involved in the sting, and the investigative journalists who have researched and reported on it.

A  wrongful death lawsuit brought by Conradt's sister was settled out of court, and none of the other men arrested in the sting could be prosecuted.

Background

To Catch a Predator

Hosted by Chris Hansen, To Catch a Predator is a series that recurred on the TV news magazine Dateline NBC. Perverted-Justice entered chat rooms and posed as children to lure such men to a sting operation.

David M. Granger, the editor-in-chief of Esquire, told the Houston Chronicle that the suspects seen on To Catch a Predator were being denied due process by conviction in the court of public opinion before they might see the inside of a courtroom to face their accusers.  By spring 2006, the segment had been repeatedly criticized for ethical and journalistic concerns.  Producer Allan Maraynes countered, saying that those involved "believe we're doing the socially responsible thing ... and the journalistically responsible thing."

Conradt

Louis William Conradt Jr. was born on January 30, 1950, in Kaufman County, Texas, to Montie Estelle King and Louis William Conradt.  Conradt Jr. graduated from Terrell High School in 1968, where he was the assistant editor of the yearbook and president of his senior class.  He received his undergraduate degree from the University of Texas, and his Juris Doctor from Texas Tech University.  His friends described him as a predictable, reserved man.  By 2006, he was still unmarried, and living in the Terrell, Texas, home at 201 Davidson Drive in which he had grown up.

Conradt was the district attorney (DA) of Kaufman County from 1980 to 2002, at which time he made an unsuccessful campaign for election to a district judgeship as a Democrat.  Afterwards, he worked in private practice, and by 2006 he was working as the chief felony assistant district attorney (ADA) for Rockwall County, Texas.  With a "near photographic memory for the law", Conradt's coworkers and courtroom opponents described him as a good prosecutor.

Sting
In July 2006, Perverted-Justice (PJ) approached the Murphy, Texas, police department (PD) about working together.  A July 24 joint sting netted the suspect's Ford Expedition as the new police chief's official vehicle.  When PJ suggested a larger operation with To Catch a Predator, Chief Billy Myrick eagerly seized the opportunity.  The Collin County, Texas district attorney, John Roach, refused to participate; he wrote an explanatory letter to the Murphy Police to "serve as a wake-up call to Chief Myrick, giving the chief an out."  Local residents protested the planned operation to lure predators to their neighborhood.

In the first days of November 2006, a Dateline NBCPerverted-Justice sting was orchestrated in Murphy without informing the mayor or city council. A house was decorated for the just-passed Halloween holiday, with the interior outfitted with multiple live audio–video feeds.

On November 3,  operatives worked to lure men to the house posing as children online; an indeterminate number of men began arriving, and were arrested after entering the house. Chief Myrick, on the other hand, thought the operation was extremely successful, hoping the Dateline exposure would bring national attention to Murphy and repeatedly joking about seizing the nice cars of arrested suspects.

inxs00

For weeks before the sting, a PJ volunteer posing as a 13-year-old boy had been chatting online with "inxs00": a man that claimed to be a college student and had sent a sexually-explicit photo.  On November 4, an NBC voice actor made telephone contact with the pseudonymous man, who ultimately provided personal information that identified him as Conradt.  Dateline and Perverted-Justice both published allegations that Conradt began deleting content from his MySpace account that night, but an Esquire investigation later put lie to those claims.  Detective Patterson was acquainted with Conradt, but could not conclusively confirm his voice from Dateline tapes, "wasn't at all sure that the necessary precautions would be taken", and was told by the show's lead producer that he could not inform his police chief about the Conradt situation.

When Conradt stopped communicating with the PJ and NBC personnel, and it became apparent he was not traveling to the Murphy house, Dateline decided for the first time to take the investigation to the suspect's house: at 12:30a.m. on November 5, Chris Hansen requested Murphy police secure arrest and search warrants for Conradt, intending to ambush him in Terrell to fulfill the To Catch a Predator formula.  Chief Myrick agreed, and rushed both warrants, foregoing any interagency coordination with the Texas Rangers, Collin County DA, or a grand jury inquiry.  The arrest warrant was ready by 11:00a.m., and signed by local municipal judge, Cathy Haden.

Suicide

Chris Hansen and his Dateline television crew arrived at Conradt's Terrell neighborhood at 8:30a.m. on November 5, hoping to ambush Conradt; they themselves were reported to police by local residents for suspicious activity.  Half as many Murphy and Terrell police arrived hours later.  Conradt did not answer officers knocking on the door to his courtyard, and confirmation of the search warrant was received at 2:20p.m.—though it had "the wrong city, county, and date."  At the suggestion of a PJ volunteer, a Terrell police sergeant tried calling Conradt, but the ADA did not answer, and the police did not leave a message.  At 2:40, the Terrell police chief called in SWAT.

The SWAT team, led by Ken McKeown, slowly arrived after 3:00p.m.  They breached Conradt's home by forcing open a sliding-glass back door, entering through the den.  The team split up, and the half that first saw Conradt at the end of a hallway variously described his last words as some variation of "I am not gonna hurt anybody."  He then shot himself in the temple with a Browning .380 pistol.  He was airlifted by CareFlite to Dallas' Parkland Memorial Hospital, where he was pronounced dead.

Aftermath
Immediately after the shooting, Detective Patterson was leaving the bait house in Murphy when local police pulled him over.  At gunpoint, they forced him from his truck and handcuffed him.  The Dateline contractor had been mistaken for a suspect in the sting who owned the same-colored make and model of truck.

Dateline claimed that police took three encrypted computers from Conradt's house, and by February 2007, were coordinating with their manufacturer to unlock the files within.  Dateline later aired an episode that claimed child pornography had been found on Conradt's laptop.  Esquire reported that Conradt's Sony VAIO laptop was seized, and while forensic analysis proved it was the computer from which Conradt chatted with the PJ volunteer, it had no illegal material or content that indicated sexual predation.

Twenty-three other men were caught in the sting; two were from Murphy.  The Collin County district attorney's office found problems with all of the arrests.  Firstly, Perverted-Justice did not provide the comprehensive chat logs of their interactions with suspects.  Secondly, by the next July, NBC had still yet to provide its video records for use in prosecution.  Third, Texas law largely requires that arrestees have an outstanding warrant, but the DA found that the Murphy police were only—at best—acting as agents of Dateline: "merely a player in the show and had no real law-enforcement position. Other people are doing the work, and the police are just there like potted plants, to make the scenery."  For an additional 16 of the cases, because neither the suspects nor PJ chatters were in Collin County, the DA had no jurisdictional authority.  On June 1, 2007, DA Roach announced that he would not pursue indictments against suspects from the Murphy bait house.

In July 2007, sister Patricia Conradt filed a wrongful death lawsuit against NBC Universal for million (equivalent to $million in ) in the United States District Court for the Southern District of New York.  NBC called the lawsuit meritless, and filed for dismissal, but Judge Denny Chin ruled against the broadcaster on the merits of intentional infliction of emotional distress and civil rights violations.  NBC said they were going to fight the suit, but on June 24, 2008, the suit was "amicably resolved".

Analysis

By those involved

Directly
In mid-2007, Chris Hansen said he had no regrets about how the Murphy/Terrell operation was handled.  Murphy's Chief Myrick told 20/20 that he was proud of the sting.

NBC's own footage shows Dateline and police personnel working together such that the TV crew was even supplying Conradt's phone number and video surveillance.  In 2007, Chief Myrick nonetheless claimed that it had been a strictly police-led operation with no undue influence from NBC or PJ, and disputed any Dateline involvement at Conradt's house.  In 2022, Hansen was still defending himself, saying that the police were in charge of all aspects: they sought warrants on their own initiative, and they were the driving force behind confronting Conradt at his house.

Indirectly
Mark Rusch was the district judge that signed the search warrant without being informed about Dateline involvement, and later blamed the Murphy police for how the situation ended.

Terrell, Texas is in Kaufman County, whose district attorney called the Terrell Police "the most incompetent bunch of buffoons you've ever seen".  He opined that Terrell's chief of police, Todd Miller, called SWAT because success in front of the nationally-broadcast Dateline cameras was the department's last chance at proving "they really weren't a bunch of lummoxes."  A friend of Conradt and over-30-year veteran attorney in Kaufman County called the SWAT decision "the stupidest and most unnecessary thing that I have ever heard of in law enforcement."

In 2007, DA Roach explained to 20/20 Brian Ross that most of the operation was entirely "for show with no real law-enforcement purpose"; that NBC and PJ muddied the legal waters regarding transcript-evidence and Miranda rights; and that the push for drama endangered both suspects and officers with unnecessarily aggressive take-downs.

By the news media
A July 2007 article in Esquire reported on many questionable aspects of the whole operation that led to Conradt's suicide.  Hansen denied much the magazine's report, saying that To Catch a Predator wielded no influence over the police investigation, they did not trespass Conradt's property, and that Perverted-Justice was not on-site in Terrell; only the last of these did the show's host concede, after conferring with his producer.

In September 2007, 20/20 reported on the Conradt case to illustrate the fraught possibilities when newsmedia and police work too closely together: Murphy police received some of their instruction from Dateline personnel, dramatic footage superceded police procedure, and both NBC employees and Perverted-Justice volunteers were "deeply involved in the operation."

References

Further reading
 
 

2006 in Texas
2006 suicides
Collin County, Texas
internet vigilantism
Kaufman County, Texas
suicides by firearm in Texas
television controversies in the United States